Boingo is the eighth and final studio album by American new wave band Oingo Boingo. It was the band's only album recorded for their new label, Giant Records, as well as the only album to be released by the band's 1994–95 line-up.

Music
After 1990's Dark at the End of the Tunnel, frontman Danny Elfman felt he was again "starting to get bored" with the band's musical direction and that a change was necessary to stay active. In 1994, he decided to reshuffle the band's line-up without a horn section or keyboards and add second guitarist Warren Fitzgerald. However, horn players Sam Phipps, Leon Schneiderman and Dale Turner, as well as keyboardist Marc Mann, are credited in the album's liner notes.

Boingo was a dramatic departure from all the band's previous album releases, featuring longer song structures with a mix of acoustic and electric guitars. Orchestral arrangements appear on several tracks, orchestrated and conducted by lead guitarist and arranger Steve Bartek.

Recording
Recording for Boingo commenced in February 1993 prior to the change of line-up, but was postponed when Danny Elfman was commissioned to score Tim Burton's The Nightmare Before Christmas. Elfman claimed that much of the earlier recordings were abandoned, although the since-departed members were credited on the final release.

The album was the first time the band had improvised some material in the studio, most notably "Pedestrian Wolves" and the long instrumental passage to "Change". The cover of the Beatles' "I Am the Walrus" was purportedly a jam recorded in one take, simply "to use up the rest of the [tape] reel", but was included on the album as an afterthought.

A number of songs recorded between 1993 and 1994 went unreleased, including "Water" and "Vultures". "Lost Like This" had originally been written and demo-recorded in 1983 for the album Good for Your Soul before resurfacing live in 1993 with a new arrangement.

Release
Upon its release, Elfman stated that Boingo was "the most challenging, fun, and difficult record we've ever done. It felt like a cold bucket of water splashed in our faces", and that he "expected" long-term fans might be put off by the new sound.

Giant Records wanted to heavily promote the album as a relaunch of the band. The songs "Hey!" and "Insanity" were released as singles, with an accompanying sinister, stop-motion music video for the latter. Giant also hoped to produce a music video for the single "Hey!", but it never came to fruition. "Hey!" peaked at No. 23 on the Billboard Alternative Songs chart in July 1994.

A limited edition package of the album, designed by Deborah Norcross, was issued in a foldout digipak, packaged with an embossed hardcover booklet containing lyrics and additional photography by Anthony Artiaga and Melodie McDaniel. A special edition was also released in Europe, featuring an additional song, "Helpless", which had previously only appeared as the B-side to the "Insanity" CD single. The American and Indonesian cassette versions of the album also included "Helpless" as its final track. Boingo was the first Oingo Boingo album without a vinyl release.

After the album's release in 1994, the band made numerous television appearances sporting new "skater" looks, with long unkempt hair and loose T-shirts, in contrast to their previous eclectically-suited appearances throughout the 1980s. Despite the recent reshuffle, Oingo Boingo announced their decision to disband in 1995, making Boingo the only studio album produced by this line-up.

Track listing

Personnel

Oingo Boingo
Danny Elfman – vocals, guitars
Steve Bartek – lead guitars
John Avila – bass, vocals
Johnny "Vatos" Hernandez – drums, percussion
Warren Fitzgerald – guitars
Sam Phipps – tenor and soprano saxophones
Leon Schneiderman – baritone sax
Dale Turner – trumpet, trombones
Marc Mann – keyboards, samples
Doug Lacy – accordion

Additional personnel
Rich Sumner – additional percussion
Katurah Clarke – additional percussion
Carl Graves – backing vocals ("Lost Like This")
Cameron Graves – backing vocals ("Insanity")
Taylor Graves – backing vocals ("Insanity")
Maxine Waters – backing vocals ("Pedestrian Wolves")
Julia Waters – backing vocals ("Pedestrian Wolves")
Fred Seykora – solo cello

Technical
Danny Elfman – co-producer, orchestral arrangements
Steve Bartek – co-producer, orchestral conductor, orchestrator
John Avila – co-producer
Shawn Murphey – orchestral engineer
Bruce Dukov – orchestral concertmaster
Patti Zimitti – orchestral contractor
Bill Jackson – engineer
Mike Piersante – second engineer
Marty Horenburg – second engineer
Steve Thompson – co-mixer
Michael Barbiero – co-mixer, additional recording
Mike Baumgartner – second engineer (mixing)
Chad Munsey – second engineer (mixing)
Jimmy "King" Amson – studio tech
Tim Durfey – studio tech
Nick Jeen – studio tech
Bruce Jacoby – studio tech
Matt Luneau – studio tech (Drum Doctors)
George Marino – mastering
Deborah Norcross – art direction, design
Anthony Artiaga – photography
Melodie McDaniel – band photos
Mike Diehl – ideoque typeface design

References 

1994 albums
Giant Records (Warner) albums
Oingo Boingo albums
Albums produced by John Avila
Albums produced by Danny Elfman
Albums produced by Steve Bartek